Brundtland's First Cabinet was a minority, Labour Government of Norway. It succeeded the Labour Cabinet Nordli, and sat between 4 February and 14 October 1981. The cabinet was the first in Norwegian history to be led by a woman. It was replaced by the Conservative Willoch's First Cabinet after the 1981 election.

Cabinet members 

|}

References 

Brundtland 1
Brundtland 1
1981 establishments in Norway
1981 disestablishments in Norway
Cabinets established in 1981
Cabinets disestablished in 1981